The Commissioner for Older People (Wales) Act 2006 (c 30) is an Act of the Parliament of the United Kingdom that establishes the office of Commissioner for Older People in Wales. The Report and Recommendations of the Welsh Assembly Government's Advisory Group on a Commissioner for Older People in Wales published in March 2004 is the precursor of the Act.

Section 23 - Commencement
The Commissioner for Older People (Wales) Act 2006 (Commencement) Order 2006 (S.I. 2006/2699 (W. 231) (C. 92)) was made under this section.

References
Halsbury's Statutes,

External links
The Commissioner for Older People (Wales) Act 2006, as amended from the National Archives.
The Commissioner for Older People (Wales) Act 2006, as originally enacted from the National Archives.
Explanatory notes to the Commissioner for Older People (Wales) Act 2006.

United Kingdom Acts of Parliament 2006
Acts of the Parliament of the United Kingdom concerning Wales
2006 in Wales